The Cold War Museum (Moscow) or Bunker GO-42, also known as "facility-02" (1947), CHZ-293 (1951), CHZ-572 (1953), and GO-42 (from 1980), and now Exhibition Complex Bunker-42, is a once-secret military complex, bunker, communication center in Moscow, Russia, near the underground Moscow Metro station Taganskaya.

History
Construction of the facility began in 1951, in connection with the early threat of nuclear war with the United States. The underground complex was built using the same technique that was used in the construction of the Moscow Metro subway, which is connected by two tunnels. The first tunnel was used to supply the facility and connects to the subway at Taganskaya (circle line) station. The second tunnel connects to the technical areas of Taganskaya.

In 1956, the facility operated as an emergency command post headquarters of Moscow antiaircraft district (PVO) communication center. Personnel at the facility, including technical staff, were changed over every 24 hours. The staff worked in short shifts in order to stay alert and prevent combat anxiety. According to recollections of veterans, many of the staff members worked for various other institutions, including the central telegraph, radio studio, and geodetic laboratory. In the 1960s, the bunker was equipped with everything needed to continue operating in the event of a nuclear attack, including food, fuel, and two artesian wells to provide clean drinking water for an extended period of time.

The 2001 Russian federal budget earmarked one million rubles for capital investments in the site.

Transfer to private ownership
In 2006, the bunker was put up for public auction by the Russian Federal Agency for State Property Management. It was purchased by a private company, Novik-Servis (Новик-Сервис) for 65 million rubles and turned into a museum called "экспозицио́нный ко́мплекс Бу́нкер-42", opened in 2006.

Capacity
Approximately 600 people could live and work in the complex for 30 days without assistance from the outside world, thanks to stores of food and medicine, an air recycling system, and diesel generators.

See also 
 Detachment Hotel
 Emergency Government Headquarters - in Canada
 The Cold War Museum – a Cold War museum in Warrenton, Virginia
 Plokštinė missile base – a Cold War museum in Lithuania

References

External links
Photos of the bunker - Flickr.com
Moscow bunkers - https://www.bunkermoscow.ru

Buildings and structures built in the Soviet Union
Military installations of the Soviet Union
Bunkers
Museums in Moscow
Cold War museums
Military and war museums in Russia
Cold War sites of the Soviet Union